Marie-Joseph Lagrange (born Albert Marie-Henri Lagrange on 7 March 1855, in Bourg-en-Bresse, died on 10 March 1938, in Marseille)  was a Catholic priest in the Dominican Order, theologian and founder of the École Biblique in Jerusalem.

Life
Albert Marie-Henri Lagrange was born 7 March 1855, in Bourg-en-Bresse, France. At the age of three, he received a blessing from the Curé d’Ars. At the junior Seminary of Autun, he studied languages: Greek, German, English, and Italian. He studied law at Paris, obtaining a Doctorate in 1878; and he was admitted to practice.

In 1878 he entered the Dominican seminary at Issy-les-Moulineaux, and from there went to the novitiate at St Maximin in Toulouse, where he received the habit and was given the name Brother Marie-Joseph. In 1880, the Dominicans were expelled from France. Lagrange went to the Spanish Dominican house of St. Stephen in Salamanca. He was ordained a priest at Zamora in 1883.

Lagrange was a professor of Church history and Holy Scripture when he was sent to Vienna to improve his knowledge of Oriental languages: Assyrian, Egyptian, Arabic, and Hebrew. He also studied Rabbinical literature. In February 1889, he was sent to Jerusalem, where in November 1890 he opened the École Pratique d’Études Bibliques (Practical School of Biblical Studies). In 1892, he founded the Revue biblique. While some contemporaries criticized the new scientific and critical approach to the Bible, Lagrange made use of it.

A scholar of wide-ranging interests, he was the author of Critique textuelle; II, La critique rationnelle (Paris, 1936), an influential handbook of textual theory and method as related to the textual criticism of the New Testament. He was made a Master of Sacred Theology in 1901. Lagrange's first article in the Revue biblique regarding the likely location of the city of David caused some criticism; even more was generated by '"The Sources of the Pentateuch", a reexamination of Moses' part in the composition of the
first five books of the Bible. But Pope Leo was not inclined to discourage new ideas.

Lagrange adhered to the 1893 encyclical Providentissimus Deus of Pope Leo XIII regarding biblical research, and as long as Pope Leo was alive, his work quietly progressed. But after Leo's death, an ultra-conservative reaction set in. Père Lagrange, like other scholars involved in the 19th-century renaissance of biblical studies, was suspected of being a Modernist. The historical-critical method was considered suspect by the Vatican. His 1904 book, The Historical Method, drew criticism. In 1905, the Pontifical Biblical Commission issued a caution about two of his methodological principles. In 1908 he petitioned the Master General for permission to withdraw from Scripture studies. Fr. Cormier, the General at the time, refused and told him to focus instead on the New Testament. In 1912 Lagrange was given an order of silence for the Revue Biblique to cease publication and to return to France. The École itself was closed for a year, and then Lagrange was sent back to Jerusalem to continue his work. 

His best known work is L’Évangile de Jésus Christ. Lagrange spent forty-five years in Jerusalem. In 1935 he returned to France permanently for reasons of health, and died on 10 March 1938 at the age of eighty-four. In 1967, his remains were returned to Jerusalem for burial in the choir of the Basilica of St-Étienne, next to the École Biblique.

Works

References

Further reading 
 Jean Guitton, Portrait du père Lagrange, celui qui a réconcilié la science et la foi, Robert Laffont, 1992.
 Bernard Montagnes, Marie-Joseph Lagrange - Une biographie critique, Paris, Cerf, 2004.

External links
 The Story of Father Marie-Joseph Lagrange: Founder of the Modern Catholic Bible Study 
 Marie-Joseph Lagrange on the Encyclopædia Britannica

1855 births
1938 deaths
French Dominicans
French biblical scholars
Roman Catholic biblical scholars
New Testament scholars
French Servants of God
People from Bourg-en-Bresse
20th-century French Catholic theologians
 Dominican Order
École Biblique